Owrang (also Romanized as Avarang and Avrang; also known as Arvik) is a village in Azghan Rural District, in the Central District of Ahar County, East Azerbaijan Province, Iran. At the 2006 census, its population was 427, in 110 families.

References 

Populated places in Ahar County